Olga Vasilyevna Morozova (born 22 February 1949) is a retired tennis player who competed for the Soviet Union. She was the runner-up in singles at the 1974 French Open and 1974 Wimbledon Championships.  Due to her achievements as both player and coach, Morozova often is referred to as the Godmother of Russian tennis.

Career
Born in Moscow, Morozova started to play tennis aged 10.   By 16, Morozova had improved so quickly that she was invited to represent the USSR at Wimbledon in the Girls Singles.  Travelling internationally for the first time and playing on grass for the first time, Morozova won the 1965 Wimbledon junior's singles title.

Morozova was the first Soviet tennis player, male or female, to reach the singles final of any major tournament when she was the runner-up at the 1972 Italian Open. However, the peak of Morozova's career came during the summer of 1974 when she was the women's singles runner-up at both Wimbledon and the French Open, losing to Chris Evert on both occasions. At Wimbledon she shocked the defending champion Billie Jean King in straight sets in the quarters, and then came back from a set down against Virginia Wade to win the semi-final 6–4 in the third. She rose to No. 3 in the world going into the US Open that year — the highest ranking she achieved in her career.

In terms of other achievements, Morozova became the first Soviet tennis player, male or female, to win a Grand Slam title when she teamed with Evert to win the women's doubles championship at the French Open in 1974. She was the first Soviet player to lead her team to the Federation Cup semifinals in 1978 (and again in 1979).  She and Alex Metreveli were the first USSR players to reach a Grand Slam final when they teamed at Wimbledon in 1968, losing to Margaret Court and Ken Fletcher.  As well as winning the French Open doubles in 1974, Morozova also was the runner-up at the 1975 Australian Open (teaming with Margaret Court), the 1975 French Open (teaming with Julie Anthony) and the 1976 US Open (teaming with Virginia Wade).

Morozova's playing career was cut short in 1977 because of the USSR's policy against allowing their athletes to compete with South Africans. At this point, she retired early from the professional tour. Morozova then began a coaching career. She became head coach of the Soviet Union ladies squad through the 1980s leading the Soviets to their first appearance in a Federation Cup Final (1988, losing to Czechoslovakia).  Morozova also helped pioneer the creation of the Kremlin Cup.

In 1990, the LTA hired Morozova as head of girls tennis, based at the national performance centre in Bisham Abbey, UK. Morozova became a fixture in UK tennis for much of the 1990s. In December 1996, in a Russian interview, she noted a key difference in approach towards sport between the two countries, England and Russia: "For them [the English], sport-wise participation is considered more important than winning. They fancy Coubertin a lot. For us, [ethnic] Russians, it is still more important to win".

In the 1990s, Morozova preferred to joke about the difference in tennis players' pay between the 1970s and 1990s: "I'm upset to the least because I wasn't paid at all." Her former compatriot and player, as a coach — Larisa Savchenko — also had a similar perspective, stating in 2021 the following: "The daily subsistence was 'decent'. Back then, all the other [USSR] sports trolled us: 'Here we are, tennis! They have $25 a day, and we have only $5'."

In 2003, she began working individually with notable players, including Elena Dementieva, Svetlana Kuznetsova, Sergiy Stakhovsky and Laura Robson. Morozova has been widely credited as one of the few successful female coaches to work at the very highest levels of the tour.

In 1998, she was awarded the Sarah Palfrey Danzig Trophy for character, sportsmanship, manners, spirit of cooperation, and contribution to the growth of the game as well as the help she rendered to professional players and junior players.

In 2000, the Russian Tennis Federation awarded Morozova the honour of Russian Tennis Player of the Twentieth Century.

Grand Slam finals

Singles: 2 (2 runner-ups)

Doubles: 4 (1 title, 3 runner-ups)

Mixed doubles: 2 (2 runner-ups)

WTA career finals

Singles: 16 (8 titles, 8 runner-ups)

Doubles: 27 (16 titles, 11 runner-ups)

ITF Circuit finals

Singles: 30 (25–5)

Doubles: 37 (27–10)

Junior Grand Slam finals

Girls' singles (1–0)

Grand Slam singles performance timeline

Bibliography

See also
 Performance timelines for all female tennis players who reached at least one Grand Slam final

References

External links
 
 
 

1949 births
Living people
Soviet female tennis players
Tennis players from Moscow
Russian tennis coaches
Grand Slam (tennis) champions in women's doubles
Grand Slam (tennis) champions in girls' singles
Universiade medalists in tennis
Tennis commentators
Universiade gold medalists for the Soviet Union
Wimbledon junior champions
French Open junior champions
French Open champions
Medalists at the 1973 Summer Universiade